
Airtech Canada is a Canadian aerospace engineering firm established at the Peterborough Airport, Ontario in 1977. It specializes in modifying aircraft for a variety of roles, particularly aero-medical conversions. It has also marketed conversions for popular radial-engined transport aircraft such as the Douglas DC-3, de Havilland Canada DHC-2 Beaver and de Havilland Canada DHC-3 Otter.

References
 
 Company website

Aircraft manufacturers of Canada
Vehicle manufacturing companies established in 1977
1977 establishments in Ontario